The 1989 Chicago White Sox season was the White Sox's 90th season. They finished with a record of 69-92, good enough for 7th place in the American League West, 29.5 games behind the 1st place Oakland Athletics.

Offseason

Potential move to Florida 
In July 1988, legislators from the State of Illinois narrowly approved a proposal for a new state-financed stadium and a lease deal that would save the team $60 million and kept the White Sox from moving to St. Petersburg, Florida.
St. Petersburg had begun construction on an $80 million domed stadium.

The club's principal owners, Jerry Reinsdorf and Eddie Einhorn, had said the team would move to St. Petersburg, Florida, for the 1989 season if the stadium proposal were not approved.

The State Senate in Springfield passed the stadium bill by a 30-26 vote about 20 minutes before midnight, then sent it on to the General Assembly, where Gov. James Thompson was involved in political maneuvering on the last day the Legislature was in session.

The money for the ball park, would come from a 2 percent city hotel-motel tax, estimated to be worth at least $8 million a year. The city would add $5 million annually in revenue-sharing funds, and the state would contribute $5 million in hotel-motel tax revenues.

Notable transactions 
 December 5, 1988: Rich Amaral was drafted by the White Sox from the Chicago Cubs in the 1988 rule 5 draft.
 December 12, 1988: Mike Diaz was released by the White Sox.
 February 10, 1989: Jerry Willard was signed as a free agent with the White Sox.
 March 23, 1989: Kenny Williams was traded by the White Sox to the Detroit Tigers for Eric King.

Regular season

Season standings

Record vs. opponents

1989 Opening Day lineup 
 Ozzie Guillén, SS
 Dave Gallagher, CF
 Harold Baines, DH
 Iván Calderón, RF
 Greg Walker, 1B
 Carlton Fisk, C
 Dan Pasqua, LF
 Steve Lyons, 2B
 Eddie Williams, 3B
 Jerry Reuss, P

Notable transactions 
 May 8, 1989: Domingo Jean was signed as an amateur free agent by the White Sox.
 June 5, 1989: Frank Thomas was selected by the White Sox in the 1st round (7th pick) of the 1989 Major League Baseball draft.
 July 1, 1989: Richard Dotson was signed as a free agent by the White Sox.
 July 29, 1989: Harold Baines and Fred Manrique were traded by the White Sox to the Texas Rangers for Sammy Sosa, Wilson Álvarez, and Scott Fletcher.

Roster

Player stats

Batting 
Note: G = Games played; AB = At bats; R = Runs scored; H = Hits; 2B = Doubles; 3B = Triples; HR = Home runs; RBI = Runs batted in; BB = Base on balls; SO = Strikeouts; AVG = Batting average; SB = Stolen bases

Pitching 
Note: W = Wins; L = Losses; ERA = Earned run average; G = Games pitched; GS = Games started; SV = Saves; IP = Innings pitched; H = Hits allowed; R = Runs allowed; ER = Earned runs allowed; HR = Home runs allowed; BB = Walks allowed; K = Strikeouts

Farm system 

LEAGUE CHAMPIONS: Vancouver, Birmingham, South Bend

References

External links 
 1989 Chicago White Sox at Baseball Reference

Chicago White Sox seasons
Chicago White Sox season
Chicago
1980s in Chicago
1989 in Illinois